Chengdu Airlines Co., Ltd., a subsidiary of Sichuan Airlines, is an airline headquartered in Shuangliu District, Chengdu, China. It operates a network of scheduled domestic passenger flights out of its hub at Chengdu Shuangliu International Airport. Chengdu Airlines is also the first user of ARJ21.

History

Originally named United Eagle Airlines CO., LTD (also known as UEAir), the company was founded in 2004 by a former executive of China Northwest Airlines, with the necessary funding being provided by the Vickers Financial Group. It took delivery of its first airliner, an Airbus A320 that previously had belonged to Air Jamaica, on 8 July 2005 and on 27 July, revenue flights were commenced. Another similar aircraft type, the slightly smaller Airbus A319, was put in service with United Eagle Airlines on 2 December of that year.

In March 2009, Sichuan Airlines invested 200 million RMB (30 million USD) in United Eagle Airlines, thus holding 76 percent of the shares. In late 2009, these shares were sold to Chinese aircraft manufacturer Comac and to Chengdu Communications Investment Group. Following this ownership change, United Eagle Airlines placed a firm order for 30 Comac ARJ21s, the first of which initially was planned to be delivered in late 2010. Since then, the Comac project has seen a series of delays, though.

On 23 January 2010, the airline was renamed Chengdu Airlines.

Destinations

Fleet

, the Chengdu Airlines fleet consists of the following aircraft:

References

External links

Official website 

Airlines established in 2004
Airlines of China
Privately held companies of China
Companies based in Chengdu
Transport in Chengdu
Chinese brands
Chinese companies established in 2004